ECI Partners is a growth focused private equity group based in the UK and the US, first established by the Bank of England in 1976.

ECI typically invests up to £100m of equity (as part of an initial transaction) in businesses valued at up to £300m

It was a founder member of the British Private Equity and Venture Capital Association in 1983 having organised its first management buyout (for Ansafone) in 1980. In the first decade of ECI's investment they were active across a range of investments including syndicated transactions; early investments included Williams Holdings – owner of Chubb and Kidd – founded by Nigel Rudd and Brian McGowan, and Shanks & McEwan.

From the start of the 1990s (ECI 4) the exclusive focus became UK mid-market buyouts investing in the likes of National Express and Bloomsbury Publishing.

The turn of the millennium saw ECI raise ECI 7 with leading growth investments including Thinkmoney and
LateRooms.

In July 2018 ECI announced the first and final closing of its eleventh buyout fund, ECI 11. ECI launched the fundraise mid-April 2018 with a target fund size of £650m and closed at the hard cap of £700m less than three months later. ECI 11 was raised without using any placement agent support.

Investments

Investments have included CIPHR, Mobysoft, CSL, KB Associates, Peoplesafe, Travel Chapter, Moneypenny, 4Ways, Arkessa, The Clear Group, Bionic,  Content+Cloud, Imagesound (a leading supplier of audio and screen media), Tusker, Investis Digital, Auction Technology Group, and Avantia, a leading online home insurance company that trades under the HomeProtect brand.

Exits

In September 2022, ECI realised its investment in MiQ, delivering a 6.1x return in a deal valued at a reported $900m. ECI originally backed the founders (Gurman Hundal and Lee Puri) in a minority investment in 2017 with MiQ growing to $45m of profit in the year before ECI exited.

in June 2022, ECI sold The Clear Group, an insurance broking platform, to Goldman Sachs Asset Management having tripled Gross Written Premium to over £330m during the four year investment.

In February 2021, ECI announced the IPO of its portfolio company Auction Technology Group on the London Stock Exchange where it became a member of the FTSE250.

In November 2020, ECI exited MPM generating a return of 4.4x.

In February 2020, ECI exited both Encore Tickets, sold to TodayTix and Auction Technology Group, in a secondary buyout delivering 3.7x money whilst also reinvesting in the latter from its most recent fund.

ECI exited mthree in December 2019, selling to Wiley (publisher) and generating a return of over 100% IRR.

In June 2018 ECI announced the sale of Great Rail Journeys, generating a 3.6x return.

In June 2017 ECI sold Kelvin Hughes to Hensoldt, (formerly Airbus Defence Electronics), which generated a 3.3x return.
 
In February 2017 ECI announced the sale of Clarke Energy to Kohler Co for a reported £300m

The sale of Reed & Mackay (premium corporate travel company) in August 2016 was ECI's 100th exit since 1990, and generated a multiple of 3.4x cost to investors.

In February 2016, ECI sold Citation, a provider of HR, employment law, and health & safety solutions to 16,000 SMEs, to HGCapital for a reported £185m. generating a 5.4x return on its investment.

In June 2015 it sold Fourth Hospitality, a restaurant management software firm to Insight Venture Partners.

In February 2015 ECI sold Wireless Logic, an M2M managed service provider, to CVC Capital Partners generating 6.1x money return.

In October 2014 ECI sold XLN Telecom to the company's management and Blackstone's credit business GSO Capital Partners generating a 3x return on its investment.

In March 2014 ECI sold CarTrawler to BC Partners for a reported €450m, returning 6x money to investors.

In February 2014 ECI sold M2 Digital to The Rigby Group through its technology brand SCC (Specialist Computer Centres).

ECI sold healthcare IT company Ascribe to AIM-listed clinical software supplier EMIS Health Group in September 2013 generating a 2.1x return.

ECI Growth Survey
 
The ECI Growth Survey is the only survey in the UK focused exclusively on growth companies. It was launched in 2010 to give owners and directors of growth companies an opportunity to voice their opinion and influence the economic debate. A number of influential figures have been involved in the survey over the years including Mark Prisk, Karan Bilimoria, Baron Bilimoria, Howard Davies, Sir Danny Alexander, Carolyn Fairbairn, Sir John Timpson, and most recently Philip Shaw, Chief Economist at Investec.

References

External links
 ECI Partners

Private equity firms of the United Kingdom
1976 establishments in England